Bara' Sami Mousa Marie() is a Jordanian footballer who plays for Al-Faisaly and for the national football team of Jordan, and was born in Saudi Arabia.

International career statistics

International goals

With U-23

References

External links 

Jordanian footballers
Jordan international footballers
Jordan youth international footballers
Jordanian expatriate footballers
Jordanian Pro League players
Sportspeople from Amman
Al-Faisaly SC players
Shabab Al-Ordon Club players
Al-Tai FC players
Abha Club players
Saudi First Division League players
Expatriate footballers in Saudi Arabia
Jordanian expatriate sportspeople in Saudi Arabia
Footballers at the 2014 Asian Games
1994 births
Living people
Association football defenders
2019 AFC Asian Cup players
Asian Games competitors for Jordan
People from Tulkarm